Jack Hillman was a footballer.

Jack Hillman may also refer to:

Jack Charles Hillman, Alberta politician
Jack Hillman, character in The Love Hermit

See also
John Hillman (disambiguation)